Greenville District is one of 16 districts of Sinoe County, Liberia. As of 2008, the population was 16,434, making it the most populous district in the county.

References

 

Districts of Liberia
Sinoe County